Nuruddin Ahmed (1904–1975) was an Indian lawyer and three-time mayor of Delhi. Born in 1904 in Delhi in a wealthy family to  Principal Mushtaq Ahmed Zahidie, of Sadiq Eggerton College, Bhawalpur, India, he did his early education at St. Xavier's School, Delhi and completed his pre-graduate studies from St. Stephen's College. Subsequently, he did Classical Tripos from Cambridge University before studying law at the Inner Temple from where he was called to the bar. Returning to India, he started his career as a junior to Muhammad Shafi where Fakhruddin Ali Ahmed, who would later become the fifth president of India, was his colleague, and started practice at Lahore High Court. Then, he went to Delhi to continue his practice and became known for his prowess in criminal trials. He was also involved in civic administration and during his four terms as a member of the Delhi Corporation, he served as the Mayor of Delhi for three terms, from 1960 to 1965. The Government of India awarded him the third highest civilian honour of the Padma Bhushan, in 1964, for his contributions to public affairs. Ameena Ahmad Ahuja, a noted artist, was his daughter. Ahmed died in 1975, at the age of 71.

References

External links 
 

Recipients of the Padma Bhushan in public affairs
1904 births
1975 deaths
20th-century Indian lawyers
Mayors of Delhi
St. Stephen's College, Delhi alumni
Indian barristers
Alumni of the University of Cambridge
Members of the Inner Temple
Date of birth missing
Date of death missing